Planet B-Boy is a 2007 documentary film that focuses on the 2005 Battle of the Year while also describing B-boy culture and history as a global phenomenon.  This documentary was directed by Canadian-American Korean filmmaker Benson Lee, shot by Portuguese-American filmmaker Vasco Nunes, and released in theaters in the United States on March 21, 2008.  It was released on DVD on November 11, 2008.

Content
Planet B-Boy features extensive footage of the dancers in competition as well as street performances and various rehearsals by the different crews from around the world.  The narrative of the film centers on five particular crews (representing France, Japan, South Korea, and the United States) in their quest to win the Battle of the Year, and it includes multiple interviews with the B-Boys and their families.  The film also includes interviews with German B-Boy and promoter Thomas Hergenröther (who founded the Battle of the Year competition) and legendary B-Boy Ken Swift of the Rock Steady Crew.

This film has been shown at numerous festivals around the world after originally making its debut on April 26, 2007, at the Tribeca Film Festival.  Planet B-Boy has received many strong reviews and currently has a 91% rating at Rotten Tomatoes - with the consensus that "Lee's dazzling documentary makes a compelling argument for breakdancing as an art form".  In March 2008 it was revealed that director Benson Lee was working on a feature adaptation of Planet B-Boy, starring Chris Brown and featuring many American b-boys such as Kid David from Renegades and Casper from Boogie Brats.

Awards and Selections
Best Documentary Feature Award – 26th San Francisco International Asian American Film Festival
Audience Award – 26th San Francisco International Asian American Film Festival
Moviesquad DOC U! Award – 2007 International Documentary Film Festival Amsterdam
Official Selection – 2007 Tribeca Film Festival
Official Selection – 2007 Sydney Film Festival
Official Selection – Edinburgh International Film Festival 2007
Official Selection – 33rd Deauville American Film Festival
Official Selection – 2008 Constellation Change Film Festival
Official Selection – 2008 Philadelphia Asian American Film Festival

References

External links 
 
 
 Interview with Benson Lee
 Planet B-Boy director aims to give break dancing its due March 2008 interview with the New York Daily News.
 Conversation with Benson Lee, Director of Planet B-Boy April 2009, State of Mind Music

2007 films
2007 documentary films
Documentary films about dance
American dance films
American documentary films
Breakdancing films
2000s English-language films
2000s American films